Nemapogon orientalis is a moth of the family Tineidae. It is found and Lebanon, Russia, Ukraine, as well as on Cyprus, Crete and the North Aegean Islands.

References

Moths described in 1961
Nemapogoninae